In a plasma, the Boltzmann relation describes the number density of an isothermal charged particle fluid when the thermal and the electrostatic forces acting on the fluid have reached equilibrium.

In many situations, the electron density of a plasma is assumed to behave according to the Boltzmann relation, due to their small mass and high mobility.

Equation

If the local electrostatic potentials at two nearby locations are φ1 and φ2, the Boltzmann relation for the electrons takes the form:

where ne is the electron number density, Te is the temperature of the plasma, and kB is the Boltzmann constant.

Derivation

A simple derivation of the Boltzmann relation for the electrons can be obtained using the momentum fluid equation of the two-fluid model of plasma physics in absence of a magnetic field. When the electrons reach dynamic equilibrium, the inertial and the collisional terms of the momentum equations are zero, and the only terms left in the equation are the pressure and electric terms. For an isothermal fluid, the pressure force takes the form 

while the electric term is 
. 
Integration leads to the expression given above.

In many problems of plasma physics, it is not useful to calculate the electric potential on the basis of the Poisson equation because the electron and ion densities are not known a priori, and if they were, because of quasineutrality the net charge density is the small difference of two large quantities, the electron and ion charge densities. If the electron density is known and the assumptions hold sufficiently well, the electric potential can be calculated simply from the Boltzmann relation.

Inaccurate situations

Discrepancies with the Boltzmann relation can occur, for example, when oscillations occur so fast that the electrons cannot find a new equilibrium (see e.g. plasma oscillations) or when the electrons are prevented from moving by a magnetic field (see e.g. lower hybrid oscillations).

See also
List of plasma (physics) articles

References

Plasma physics